Minion is a solver for constraint satisfaction problems. Unlike constraint programming toolkits, which expect users to write programs in a traditional programming language like C++, Java or Prolog, Minion takes a text file which specifies the problem, and solves using only this. This makes using Minion much simpler, at the cost of much less customization.

This limitation allows Minion to be many times faster than competing commercial solvers, for example Minion was found to be faster than the major commercial constraint solver, CPLEX (formerly ILOG CPLEX then IBM ILOG).

External links
 Minion homepage

Constraint programming